Thiruvananthapuram - Kozhikode  Jan Shatabdi Express is a daily running Jan Shatabdi Express train belonging to Trivandrum Division of Southern Railway zone of Indian Railways that runs between Thiruvananthapuram Central and Kozhikode stations in Kerala state of India.It is the fastest train that runs through Kerala and is heavily subscribed to. It clocks a maximum of 110 km/hr during its journey.

Name of the train
Jan Shatabdi Express is a more affordable variety of the Shatabdi Express, which has both AC and non-AC accommodation. The word 'Jan' refers to common people.

Route
The train was initially running between Thiruvananthapuram Central and Ernakulam Junction via Alappuzha. The train was extended to Kozhikode on 14 August 2009. The train halts at 12 stations.

Coach Composition
The train has 18 second class seating coaches named D1-D16 (including 2 SLRs-  SL1 & SL2) and 3 AC Chair car coaches.

Traction
Both trains are hauled by an Erode(ED) based WAP-7. Earlier it used to be hauled by an Ernakulam based WDM-3A between CLT and SRR and an Erode/Arakkonam based WAP-4/WAP-1 for rest of the journey

See also
Kannur Jan Shatabdi Express
Jan Shatabdi Express
Indian Railways

References

External links
Kozhikode-Thiruvananthapuram Jan Shatabdi Express

Transport in Thiruvananthapuram
Transport in Kozhikode
Jan Shatabdi Express trains
Rail transport in Kerala